Madhavrao Shindhia Cricket Ground also known as Municipal Ground or Racecourse Ground Corporation Ground is located in Rajkot, Gujarat.

As of 19 August 2017 it has hosted 12 ODIs.

History

Madhavrao Scindia Cricket Ground is also used for staging first class cricket. It has hosted 86 first class cricket match.

The ground dimensions being comparatively small and the pitch usually is batsman-friendly contributed to some enormous scores in the past.
New Zealand scored 349/5 in 2001, India scored 387/5 in 2008 but the best ever was in the Game between India and Sri Lanka on 15 December 2009 when India scored 414 runs (then highest ever in Indian history) but Sri Lanka almost won the contest and ended up with 411/8, just 3 runs short making it only second ODI match in which both team scored more than 400.

This stadium has a spectator capacity of 28,000 and plays host to international and IPL matches. The new stadium is a modern complex which has a cricket ground & stadium, basketball, tennis, volleyball, badminton and squash courts, a swimming pool and an indoor stadium.

The Madhavrao Scindia Cricket Ground has since been used only as a venue for First-class and List A matches for the Indian domestic team of Saurashtra.

Ground Facts

 The highest partnership at the Madhavrao Scindia Cricket Ground is 196 by SC Ganguly & Virendar Sehwag for India against West Indies in the 2003/2004 season.
 The highest score by an individual batsman at the Madhavrao Scindia Cricket Ground is 160 by Tillakaratne Dilshan for Sri Lanka against India on 15 December 2009.
 The highest ODI total at the Madhavrao Scindia Cricket Ground is 414/7 by India against Sri Lanka in the 2009 season, it is also the second Highest ODI Score for India until India scored 418/5 against West Indies.
 The lowest ODI total at the Madhavrao Scindia Cricket Ground is 176/9 by West Indies against Sri Lanka in the 1998 season.
Most runs scored here were by Virendar Sehwag- 405 runs, Tillakaratne Dilshan 275 runs and Yuvraj Singh- 246 runs.
Most wickets were by Venkatesh Prasad and Harbhajan Singh- 6 wickets and RP Singh- 5 wickets.

List of Centuries

Key
 * denotes that the batsman was not out.
 Inns. denotes the number of the innings in the match.
 Balls denotes the number of balls faced in an innings.
 NR denotes that the number of balls was not recorded.
 Parentheses next to the player's score denotes his century number at Madhavrao Scindia Cricket Ground.
 The column title Date refers to the date the match started.
 The column title Result refers to the player's team result

One Day Internationals

References

External links
 Cricinfo Website - Ground Page
 CricketArchive Website - Ground Page

Rajkot
Buildings and structures in Rajkot
Cricket grounds in Saurashtra (region)
Sports venues in Saurashtra (region)
Sports venues completed in 1935
1935 establishments in India